Collingwood railway station is located on the Mernda and Hurstbridge lines in Victoria, Australia. It serves the north-eastern Melbourne suburb of Abbotsford, and opened on 21 October 1901 as Collingwood Town Hall. It was renamed Collingwood on 1 May 1909.

Whilst it is named after Collingwood (and, originally, the adjacent Collingwood Town Hall), the station is actually located in the neighbouring suburb of Abbotsford.

History
Collingwood station opened on 21 October 1901, when the direct line between Princes Bridge and Clifton Hill opened.

During 1986 and 1987, the station buildings and platforms were rebuilt, and were in use by 7 September 1987.

Platforms and services
Collingwood has two side platforms. It is served by Mernda and Hurstbridge line trains.

Platform 1:
  all stations services to Flinders Street
  all stations services to Flinders Street

Platform 2:
  all stations services to Mernda
  all stations and limited express services to Macleod, Greensborough, Eltham and Hurstbridge

Transport links
Kinetic Melbourne operates twelve bus routes via Collingwood station, under contract to Public Transport Victoria:
 : Elsternwick station – Clifton Hill
 : Melbourne CBD (Lonsdale Street) – Box Hill station
 : Melbourne CBD (Queen Street) – Ringwood North
 : Melbourne CBD (Lonsdale Street) – Westfield Doncaster
 : Melbourne CBD (Lonsdale Street) – The Pines Shopping Centre (peak-hour only)
 : Melbourne CBD (Queen Street) – Donvale
 : Melbourne CBD (Lonsdale Street) – Deep Creek Reserve (Doncaster East)
 : Melbourne CBD (Queen Street) – La Trobe University Bundoora Campus
  : Melbourne CBD (Lonsdale Street) – The Pines Shopping Centre
  : Melbourne CBD (Lonsdale Street) – Warrandyte
  : Melbourne CBD (Lonsdale Street) – Mitcham station
  : Melbourne CBD (Lonsdale Street) – The Pines Shopping Centre (peak-hour only)

McKenzie's Tourist Services operates one bus route via Collingwood station, under contract to Public Transport Victoria:
 : Eildon – Southern Cross station

References

External links
 Melway map at street-directory.com.au

Railway stations in Melbourne
Railway stations in Australia opened in 1901
Railway stations in the City of Yarra